Clear Lake may refer to one of several places in the U.S. state of Oregon:

There are 11 bodies of water listed as of May 28, 2010.

See also
 List of lakes in Oregon

Lakes of Oregon